Racovița is a commune located in Vâlcea County, Muntenia, Romania. It is composed of seven villages: Balota, Blănoiu, Bradu-Clocotici, Copăceni, Gruiu Lupului, Racovița and Tuțulești.

References

Communes in Vâlcea County
Localities in Muntenia